O'Jay Ferguson (born 17 October 1993) is a Jamaican born Bahamian sprinter . He attended Western Texas College in Snyder, Texas.

On 24 March 2012, Ferguson ran a personal best 46.14 sec 400 metres at the UTEP Springtime Invitational in El Paso, Texas, which would have improved the Bahamian national junior record set by Troy McIntosh in 1992, if it wasn't for Ferguson's unclear citizenship status. , Ferguson's time ranks fourth in the world among juniors, behind only Aldrich Bailey, Steven Solomon, and Luguelín Santos.

Ferguson attended C. R. Walker High School in New Providence, The Bahamas.

Ferguson represented the Bahamas in 4 × 400 metres relay at the 2013 and 2017 World Championships.

References

1993 births
Living people
Bahamian people of Jamaican descent
Bahamian male sprinters
People from New Providence
People from Snyder, Texas
Bahamian emigrants to the United States
World Athletics Championships athletes for the Bahamas
Commonwealth Games medallists in athletics
Commonwealth Games silver medallists for the Bahamas
Athletes (track and field) at the 2018 Commonwealth Games
Athletes (track and field) at the 2019 Pan American Games
Pan American Games competitors for the Bahamas
Western Texas College alumni
Medallists at the 2018 Commonwealth Games